Pallikondeswara Temple(also Pradosha kshetram) is a Hindu temple dedicated to the god Shiva located in Surutupalle, a village in Chittoor district of Andhra Pradesh, India. The presiding deity Pallikondeswara, unlike other Shiva temples, is sported in reclining posture lying on the lap of his consort Parvati.

The temple house a three-tiered gateway tower known as gopurams. The temple has numerous shrines, with those of Valmeegeeswarar and Maragathambigai being the most prominent. The temple complex houses many halls and three precincts. The temple has six daily rituals at various times from 6:30 a.m. to 9 p.m., and five yearly festivals on its calendar. The Aipassi Annabishekam is the major festival in the temple. The temple was built by Vijayanagara king Harihara Bukka Raya (1344-47). In modern times, the temple is maintained and administered by State Institute of Temple Administration (SITA) of the Government of Andhra Pradesh.

Legend 
During the Samudra manthan (churning of the ocean of milk) by the gods and demons, many treasures along with the Amrita (elixir of the gods) and the poison Halahala rose from the ocean. To rescue the beings of the world from the poison, Shiva consumed it. When the poison was just going down the throat of Shiva, his consort Parvati stopped it there by tightly holding Shiva’s throat, turning Shiva's neck blue. After the episode, Shiva proceeded to his abode Kailash with Parvati. On the way, he felt exhausted and slightly uncomfortable, when he reached a place in the bounds of Andhra, which came to be called Suruttappalli. There, He lied down to relax, keeping his head in the lap of Parvati. The gods, who were concerned about Shiva’s well-being assembled there and stood around him, waiting for the Lord to open his eyes. This lying posture of Shiva is rare and unique, is almost similar to Vishnu’s reclining posture.

Architecture 

The temple was built by Vijayanagara king Harihara Bukka Raya (1344-47). The temple has an inscription stating the temple was renovated by Kalahasti princess in 1833. Sri Chandrashekarendra Saraswati of Kanchi Mutt camped here for 40 days in 1976, he showed a place and asked people to dig it, when they did, they found the stone and Mahaperiyava disclosed that the footprints are those of Rama's twins Lava and Kusha. Sri Jayendra Saraswati and Sri Vijayendra Saraswati performed the Kumbabhishekam of the temple on June 23 2002. In modern times, the temple is maintained and administered by State Institute of Temple Administration (SITA) of the Government of Andhra Pradesh. Palli Kondeswarar translates to reclining deity. Shiva as Palli Kondeswarar is seen in a reclining posture in the lap of his consort Parvati as Sarva Mangalambika, which is typical of Ranganatha form of the god Vishnu.  The temple was built during the late Vijayanagara period and the deity here is termed as Bhoga sayana Siva. The temple house a three-tiered gateway tower known as gopurams. This icon of Shiva is unusual; most Shiva temples contain a Lingam, his aniconic symbol, as the central icon. The gods Ganesha, Kartikeya, Surya, Chandra, Indra and sages such as Narada are seen standing around Shiva.

The temple has many icons, besides the central icon for Brahma, Vishnu, Chandra, Kubera, Surya, Indra, Ganesha, Kartikeya with consorts Valli and Devayanai. There are icons for sages Bhrigu, Markandeya, Narada, Agastya, Pulastya, Gautama, Tumburu, Vashista, Viswamitra and Valmiki. Adishankara, another form of Shiva, in a separate niche. There are shrines for Navagraha, the nine planetary deities and Sanganidhi and Padumanidhi with their consorts Vasundara and Vasumadhi respectively.

Deities inside the Temple
 Palli Kondeswara with Sarvamangalambika
 Valmikeswara
 Maragathambika
 Ramalingeswara
 Vinayaka
 Varasiddhi Vinayaka
 Subrahmanya with Devasena and Valli
 Saligrama Vinayaka
 Bala Subramanya Swamy
 Rajarajeshwari
 Mahalakshmi
 Saraswathi
 Annapoorni
 Durga Devi
 Lingodbhava
 Brahma
 Bhairava
 Valmiki
 Kubera
 Aiyanar with Poorna and Pushkala
 Ayyappan with Gajavahanam
 Thambathya Dakshinamurthy
 Jwarahareswara
 Vishnu
 Kasi Vishwanathar
 Vishalakshi Amman
 Venugopalaswamy
 Ekapadha Trimurti
 Adhikara Nandi
 Chandikeswarar
 Raja Matangi
 Sapthamatrikas
 Navagrahas
 Nataraja and Sivakami
 Footprints of Lava and Kusha
 Sambandar
 Appar
 Sundarar
 Manikkavacakar
 In Pallikondeswara shrine he is seen in reclining posture on Parvati's lap. Brahma, Vishnu, Markandeya, Narada, Chandra, Kubera, Indra, Surya, Ganesha, Kartikeya with consorts Valli and Deivanai, Bhrigu, Agastya, Pulastya, Tumburu, Gautama, Vasishta, Vishwamitra and Valmiki were surrounded.
 In Ramalingeswara shrine there are shrines for Rama, Sita, Lakshmana, Anjaneya, Bharata and Shatrughna.
 In Maragathambikai shrine instead of Dwarashaktis Kalpavriksha and Kamadhenu were present.
 In Valimikeswara shrine instead of Dwarapalakas Sankhanidhi and Padmanidhi with their consorts were present.

Worship practices 

The temple priests perform the puja (rituals) during festivals and on a daily basis. Like other Shiva temples of Tamil Nadu, the priests belong to the Shaiva community, a Brahmin sub-caste. The temple rituals are performed six times a day; Ushathkalam at 6:30 a.m., Kalasanthi at 8:00 a.m., Uchikalam at 12:00 a.m., Sayarakshai at 5:00 p.m., and Ardha Jamam at 8:00 p.m. Each ritual comprises four steps: abhisheka (sacred bath), alangaram (decoration), naivethanam (food offering) and deepa aradanai (waving of lamps) for both Valmeegeswarar and Maraganthibigai. The worship is held amidst music with nagaswaram (pipe instrument) and tavil (percussion instrument), religious instructions in the Vedas (sacred texts) read by priests and prostration by worshipers in front of the temple mast.
Pradosham, the fortnightingly festival is celebrated in all the south Indian temples. This temple garners around 15,000 visitors during pradosham and around 30,000 during the Sivarathri festival.

Notes

References

External links

Hindu temples in Chittoor district
Shiva temples in Andhra Pradesh